Abdul Hamid Tajik (born 1923) was an Afghan footballer who competed at the 1948 Summer Olympic Games.

References

External links

Afghan footballers
Olympic footballers of Afghanistan
Footballers at the 1948 Summer Olympics
1923 births
Possibly living people
Association football forwards